Donncoirce (or Donn Corci) was probably king of Dál Riata until his death in 792.

Donncoirce's death, the only report of his existence, appears in the Annals of Ulster for the year 791, corresponding with 792 AD. In it he is called "Donncoirce, king of Dál Riata". Donncoirce is not listed as a king in the Synchronisms of Flann Mainistrech, or in the Duan Albanach, nor does he appear under this name in any surviving genealogies. 

Alan Orr Anderson suggested that the name Donncoirce may be a byname, perhaps meaning "Brown Oats".

Donncoirce is the last king of Dál Riata so called by surviving Irish annals.

Dauvit Broun's reconstruction of the late Dál Riata kings places the beginning of Donncoirce's reign at the death of Fergus mac Echdach in 781 or 782.

References

 Anderson, Alan Orr, Early Sources of Scottish History A.D 500–1286, volume 1. Reprinted with corrections. Paul Watkins, Stamford, 1990. 
 Anderson, Marjorie Ogilvie, Kings and Kingship in Early Scotland. Scottish Academic Press, Edinburgh, revised edition 1980. 
 Bannerman, John, "The Scottish Takeover of Pictland" in Dauvit Broun & Thomas Owen Clancy (eds.) Spes Scotorum: Hope of Scots. Saint Columba, Iona and Scotland. T & T Clark, Edinburgh, 1999. 
 Broun, Dauvit, "Pictish Kings 761–839: Integration with Dál Riata or Separate Development" in Sally M. Foster (ed.), The St Andrews Sarcophagus: A Pictish masterpiece and its international connections. Four Courts, Dublin, 1998. 

8th-century births
792 deaths
Kings of Dál Riata
8th-century Irish monarchs
8th-century Scottish monarchs